PomB is a protein that is part of the stator in Na+ driven bacterial flagella.  Na influx to torque generation in the polar flagellar motor of Vibrio alginolyticus. The stator complex is fixed-anchored around the rotor through a putative peptidoglycan-binding (PGB) domain in the periplasmic region of PomB.

See also
MotB -  MotA and MotB make the stator
MotA -  MotA and MotB make the stator
PomA -  protein that is part of the stator in Na+ 
Integral membrane protein a type of membrane protein
Archaellum
Cilium
Ciliopathy
Rotating locomotion in living systems
Undulipodium

References

Motor proteins
Bacterial proteins